The Focke-Wulf Ta 254 was a proposed German development of the Ta 154 fighter, to have been produced by Focke-Wulf.

Development
The Ta 254 would have been a high-wing monoplane with retractable tricycle landing gear. It was to have been powered by either two Daimler-Benz DB603E, Daimler-Benz DB 603L or Jumo 213Es piston engines. The main difference from the Ta 154 was to have been long-span wings, and it was intended to produce both day and night fighter variants.

Specifications (Proposed with Jumo 213E)

See also

References

Citations

Bibliography

Abandoned military aircraft projects of Germany
Ta 254
1940s German fighter aircraft
High-wing aircraft
Twin piston-engined tractor aircraft